The 1970 Houston Oilers season was the 11th season overall and its first as part of the National Football League. The team failed to improve on their previous season's 6–6–2 record, winning only three games. The Oilers started the season winning two of its first three games, both road wins against the Steelers and Bengals. 

The Oilers struggled the rest of the season, as they went 0-6-1 following the 2-1 start. In week five versus the Steelers in the Astrodome, starting quarterback Charley Johnson suffered a broken clavicle when he was clipped by Pittsburgh defensive tackle Chuck Hinton on an interception return. Johnson returned after missing four games, but was nowhere near as effective than before the injury.

The Oilers won only one of their last 11 games, a 31-21 win over the Denver Broncos, before losing their final 3 games of the season, including a 52-10 rout by in-state rival Dallas in the finale, to finish the season 3-10-1. They missed the playoffs for the second time in three seasons, and for the first of eight consecutive seasons.

Offseason

NFL draft

Roster

Schedule

Standings

References

1970
Houston Oilers
Houston